Allen County War Memorial Coliseum is a 13,000-seat multi-purpose arena located in Fort Wayne, Indiana, near present-day Johnny Appleseed Park. It opened in 1952 with a construction cost of nearly $3 million. The Allen County War Memorial Coliseum was originally designed to seat 8,103 for hockey or 10,240 for basketball. Opened in 1989, the Coliseum's $26 million Exposition Center contains 108,000-ft² (0.100-km2) devoted to hosting substantial trade shows and other events with seating for 7,500.

The structure was designed by A.M. Strauss Architects.

Sports
The Allen County War Memorial Coliseum is the current home of the:
 Fort Wayne Komets of the ECHL ice hockey league,
 Fort Wayne Mad Ants of the NBA G League, and
 Fort Wayne Derby Girls of the Women's Flat Track Derby Association Division 2.

Major events
In basketball, Allen County War Memorial Coliseum has hosted the 1955 and 1956 NBA Finals, the 1953 NBA All-Star Game, the 1994 CBA All-Star Game and the 2014 and 2015 NBA D-League Finals. Memorial Coliseum has also hosted several NCAA events, including the 2000, 2001, and 2002 Mid-Continent Conference men's basketball tournaments and the 1988, 1994, and 2000 NCAA Final Four Men's Division I Volleyball Championships. Most recently, the University of Notre Dame hosted the 2010 NCAA Men's Division I Ice Hockey Tournament Midwest Regional at Memorial Coliseum.

The arena has hosted college wrestling tournaments as well as the sectional, regional and semistate championships of the IHSAA Boys Basketball Tournament during the one-class era.

The Coliseum was selected in April 2017 as one of the sites for the "Sweet 16" round of the 2020 NCAA Division I Women's Basketball Championship and the "Final Four" of the NCAA Men's Division III Basketball Championship in 2019, 2020, 2021 and 2022.

The Coliseum has hosted several live events by World Wrestling Entertainment.

Related facilities
The Allen County War Memorial Coliseum complex includes the Allen County War Memorial Coliseum Exposition Center and Holiday Inn, managed in cooperation with Purdue-Fort Wayne.

Exposition Center
Within the same complex as the arena, the Allen County War Memorial Coliseum Exposition Center contains 108,000-ft² (0.100-km2) devoted to hosting substantial trade shows, banquets, graduation ceremonies, concerts, truck and tractor pulls, and wrestling matches, with the capability of seating 7,500 guests. When no events are scheduled for the arena, the Exposition Center's capacity can extend to a total of 175,000-ft² (0.162-km2). The Exposition Center was added in the $26 million renovation and expansion of the complex, completed in 1989.

Grounds
The grounds immediately surrounding the Allen County War Memorial Coliseum display the anchor from World War II's  battleship. South and east of the central complex is an expansive parking lot, containing 4,500 available parking spaces. To the south and west along the St. Joseph River, lies Johnny Appleseed Park, containing the gravesite of American folklore figure John Chapman. To the north and northeast is the PurdueFW campus, especially the portion of the PurdueFW campus located on the western bank of the St. Joseph, on which a 151-room Holiday Inn is located.

Recent construction
In 2013, a $3.96 million renovation and expansion of the 200 Level was completed. The project included upgraded restrooms with LED lighting, no-touch sinks, no-touch toilets, and no-touch urinals, and the addition of two food courts with three new vendors. Other restrooms throughout the Memorial Coliseum were upgraded in 2014. The ribbon cutting ceremony was October 11, 2013. In 2018, a new 4-sided LED scoreboard was installed by Daktronics, Inc. The screens from the previous scoreboard were placed in each corner of the arena.

Other events

Midget car racing

The Coliseum Arena hosted the first ever United States Auto Club race in 1956, a 100-lap midget car race at a 1/10 mile oval. The event continued until 1989, usually with two separate events in early and late January.

Since 1998, the Coliseum Exposition Center has hosted the Rumble in Fort Wayne, an annual midget car race. Featuring a 1/6 mile flat oval, it takes place at the end of the year, and after most major racing series seasons have ended. It has allowed drivers from major racing series to participate: Dave Darland, Tracy Hines, J. J. Yeley, Bryan Clauson, Sammy Swindell; with NASCAR, USAC, and IndyCar champion Tony Stewart having the most feature wins at 9.

Politics
On May 1, 2016, Donald Trump held a campaign rally ahead of the Indiana Primary election at the Allen County War Memorial Coliseum. Over 12,500 were in attendance.

On November 5, 2018, then President Donald Trump returned to the Allen County War Memorial Coliseum on the eve of the Midterm Election, holding a rally for his administration and to aid Mike Braun in his efforts to win a seat in the United States Senate. Coliseum officials estimated 20,000 Trump supporters attended the rally.

References

External links

 Official site
 Visit Fort Wayne
 Timeline: Important Precedents in Stadium Design by Columbia University
 PurdueFW Mastodons - Allen County War Memorial Coliseum

College basketball venues in the United States
Indoor ice hockey venues in the United States
Indoor soccer venues in the United States
Basketball venues in Indiana
Convention centers in Indiana
Former National Basketball Association venues
NBA G League venues
Fort Wayne Mad Ants
Purdue Fort Wayne Mastodons men's basketball
Sports venues in Fort Wayne, Indiana
College ice hockey venues in the United States
Sports venues completed in 1952
1952 establishments in Indiana
Continental Basketball Association venues
Gymnastics venues in Indiana
Ice hockey venues in Indiana
Indoor arenas in Indiana
Music venues in Indiana
Volleyball venues in Indiana
Wrestling venues in Indiana